Dolores G. Cooper (November 2, 1922 – January 15, 1999) was an American politician.

Born in Baltimore, Maryland, Cooper was a public relations consultant. She moved to Atlantic City, New Jersey and then to Linwood, New Jersey. Cooper served as an Atlantic County, New Jersey freeholder. Cooper served in the New Jersey General Assembly from 1982 to 1992 and was a Republican. Cooper died at Shore Medical Center in Somers Point, New Jersey.

References

1922 births
1999 deaths
Politicians from Baltimore
Politicians from Atlantic City, New Jersey
People from Linwood, New Jersey
Businesspeople from New Jersey
Republican Party members of the New Jersey General Assembly
County commissioners in New Jersey
Women state legislators in New Jersey
20th-century American women politicians
20th-century American politicians
20th-century American businesspeople